Farmer is an English surname. Although an occupationally derived surname, it was not given to tillers of the soil, but to collectors of taxes and tithes specializing in the collection of funds from agricultural leases.  In 2000, there were 68,309 people with the last name Farmer in the United States, making it the 431st most common last name in the nation.

Notable people bearing the surname Farmer
Art Farmer (1928–1999), American jazz trumpeter and flugelhorn player
Beverley Farmer (born 1941), Australian writer
Bill Farmer (born 1952), American voice actor and comedian
Bill Farmer (public servant) (born 1947), former senior Australian public servant
Buck Farmer (born 1991), American baseball player
Charles "Red" Farmer (born c. 1930), American NASCAR race driver
Dan Farmer (born 1962), American computer security researcher
Darci Lynne Farmer (born 2004), American ventriloquist
Declan Farmer (born 1997), American sledge hockey player
Desmon Farmer (born 1981), American professional basketball player
Donald Dickson Farmer (1877–1956), Scottish recipient of the Victoria Cross
Ed Farmer (1949–2020), American professional baseball player and broadcaster
Edward McNeil Farmer (1901–1969) American watercolorist and oil painter, former professor at Stanford University.
Emily Farmer (1826–1905), English water-colourist and Victorian painter
Evan Farmer (born 1972), American actor, musician, and television personality
Fannie Farmer (1857–1915), American culinary expert and cookbook author
Frances Farmer (1913–1970), American film actress
Frank Farmer (disambiguation), multiple people
Gary Farmer (born 1953), Canadian First Nations actor
George Farmer (disambiguation), multiple people
Graham Farmer (born 1935), Australian rules football player and coach
Henry George Farmer (1882–1965), British musicologist
J. Doyne Farmer (born 1952), American physicist
James Farmer (disambiguation), multiple people named James or Jim(my) Farmer
Jean Farmer-Butterfield (born 1947), American politician from North Carolina
Jeff Farmer (footballer) (born 1977), Aboriginal Australian rules footballer
Jeff Farmer (wrestler) (born 1962), professional wrestler known as The Black Scorpion
John Farmer (disambiguation), multiple people
Joseph John Farmer (1854–1930), English recipient of the Victoria Cross
Karl Farmer (born 1954), American football player
Ken Farmer (1910–1982), Australian rules football player
Kenneth Farmer (1912–2005), Canadian hockey player and businessman
Kyle Farmer (born 1990), American baseball player
Larry Farmer (born 1942), American professor of law at Brigham Young University
Larry Farmer (born 1951), American college basketball coach
Lydia Hoyt Farmer (1842–1903), American author, women's rights activist
Mark Farmer (born 1957), British comic book artist
Michael Farmer (disambiguation), multiple people
Mimsy Farmer (born 1945), American actress and sculptor living in France
Moses G. Farmer (1820–1893), American electrical engineer and inventor, pioneer in telegraphy
Mylène Farmer (born 1961), Canadian-born French singer and songwriter
Nancy Farmer (politician) (born 1956), American politician from Missouri
Nancy Farmer (author) (born 1941), American author of children's books
Pat Farmer (born 1962), Australian politician, member of the Australian House of Representatives from New South Wales
Pat Farmer (soccer) (born 1949), American soccer coach
Paul Farmer (1959-2022), American physician and professor at Harvard University
Paul S. Farmer (born 1950), pioneer in the use of pop music in UK school music education in the 1970s
Penelope Farmer (born 1939), British writer of books for children and adults
Peter Farmer (disambiguation), multiple people
Philip José Farmer (1918–2009), American science fiction and fantasy author
Randy Farmer (born 1961), American pioneer in creating online communities
Richard Farmer (1735–1797), English Shakespearean scholar
Richard T. Farmer (contemporary), American businessman
Richie Farmer (born 1969), American politician and former college basketball player
Seymour Farmer (1875–1951), Welsh-Canadian politician, mayor of Winnipeg
Susan Farmer (1942–2013), American politician, media executive and television personality
Suzan Farmer (1942–2017), English actress
Terry Farmer (1931–2014), English professional footballer
Tom Farmer (born 1940), Scottish entrepreneur and millionaire
Wilfred Farmer (1921–1975), Barbadian cricketer and police officer
William M. Farmer (1853–1931), American jurist and politician
Little Willie Farmer (born 1956), American blues singer, guitarist, and songwriter

See also
Farmar, surname

References

External links
Hamrick Software  (Map showing the frequency of the surname Farmer in the United States 1850–1990)

Occupational surnames
English-language surnames
English-language occupational surnames